Kealoha (born Steven Kealohapauʻole Hong-Ming Wong) is a poet and storyteller based in Hawaii. He was the first Poet Laureate of Hawaii and the first poet to perform at a Hawaii governor’s inauguration. In 2022 he received a Poets Laureate Fellowship from the Academy of American Poets.

Poetry

He is an internationally acclaimed poet and storyteller who has performed throughout the world from the White House to ‘Iolani Palace and including hundreds of live venues. In 2010, he was honored as a "National Slam Legend" at the National Poetry Slam and was selected as a master artist for a National Endowment for the Arts program.  In the genre of storytelling, he has gained national recognition by showcasing at events such as the National Storytelling Network Conference, the Bay Area Storytelling Festival, and the Honolulu Storytelling Festival.

He is of multi-ethnic heritage with Hawaiian, Chinese, and Caucasian descent.  With a degree in Nuclear Engineering from MIT in 1999,  Kealoha has developed a poetic style that combines analysis with creative writing to investigate social, personal, and philosophical themes. He has worked for interscope records since 2001. He is the founder of HawaiiSlam, First Thursdays, and Youth Speaks Hawai`i.

Kealoha's work involves many focal themes such as nature, family, and culture, that can be found throughout all of his poetry. He is a proponent of "the spoken word" and believes it to be one of the most powerful tools that humans possess, saying "It makes us laugh and cry and wonder and empathize. It provides a mirror for us so we can see who we are as individuals and as a collective. It documents our beliefs and our many cultures through space and time. It expresses all facets of our humanity from the beautiful to the ugly. It shows us what is possible. It inspires us. It shifts our paradigms. It helps us grow." In fact, "the spoken word" is what inspired him to drop his life in Nuclear engineering and pursue poetry. It was exposure to slam poetry that made Kealoha rethink his path and return to Hawaii to pursue slam poetry.

His best known work is the performance poem Dichotomy (a.k.a. Hawaiian in the 21st Century), an identity piece that demonstrates conflicting arguments within the Native Hawaiian community.  Written in 2004, Dichotomy has been used in classrooms throughout the state of Hawaii to spark debate and dialogue within Hawai`i's youth.  Dichotomy debuted outside of Hawai`i in 2007 at the National Poetry Slam, helping Kealoha to place 8th individually out of over 350 of the world's best slam poets.

Other signature pieces include Recess (an uplifting piece that reminisces about playing on the playground and warns the audience not to fall into complacency), The Male Feminist (an empathetic male's perspective on violence towards women), Destiny (a philosophical investigation of the popular notion of destiny), Zoom Out (an existential look at the way we live our lives), Chances (a piece that uses the probability of our individual existences to deliver an inspiring message), and most recently, "The Story of Everything" (A long and theatrical epic poem that explains the history of the world and how it works through the lease of Kealoha's eyes).

Kealoha currently lives in Honolulu, and serves as HawaiiSlam's SlamMaster. He hosts the First Thursdays poetry slam at Fresh Cafe, which is the largest registered poetry slam in the world (with an average attendance of 500+). He did nuclear fusion research, management consulting, and surf instructing prior to making a living as a professional slam poet in 2002.

Career highlights
 Performed at the White House Initiative on Asian Americans and Pacific Islanders: National Philanthropic Briefing (2012).
 Represented Hawai`i at 7 National Poetry Slams (2003–2009) and performed on the finals stage four times (2004, 2005, 2007, 2008).  Ranked 8th individually out of 350 poets in 2007, and was captain of the 5th ranked team in 2009. At the 2010 National Poetry Slam, was a performer for the opening ceremonies and was honored as a "National Slam Legend."
 Featured at major venues throughout the world including the Nuyorican Poets Cafe (New York City), the Bowery Poetry Club (New York City), the Green Mill (Chicago), New Jersey Performing Arts Center (Planet Hip-Hop Festival), the Schiffbau (Zurich, Switzerland), the Rokerij (Amsterdam, Netherlands), the Bienal do Ibirapuera (São Paulo, Brazil), and the NFL Pro Bowl halftime show.
 Featured on HBO’s Brave New Voices series presented by Russel Simmons (2009).
 Coached the Youth Speaks Hawai`i team that won the championship for the International Youth Poetry Slam in 2008.
 Poetic vocalist for Henry Kapono's Wild Hawaiian project, whose album was nominated for a Grammy.
 Featured storyteller at the National Storytelling Network Conference, the Bay Area Storytelling Festival, and the Honolulu Storytelling Festival.
 Wrote, performed in, and co-directed the State of Hawaii's "Can't Fool the Youth" anti-smoking campaign.
 Interview subject on PBS's Long Story Short with Leslie Wilcox (2010)
 Actor in the film "Get a Job," winner of "Jury Award" at Las Vegas Film Festival, "Best Comedy" at Ventura Film Festival and Detroit Windsor International Film Festival, and nominee for "Best Film" at Marbella Internacional Film Festival (2010)
 Composed and performed two original pieces for the Na Hoku Hanohano Awards show (Hawaii's Grammys), once for the opening sequence and once with Henry Kapono and Mick Fleetwood (2010)
 Performed poetry at the World Invitational Hula Festival (2009)
 Featured 4 times on the "World's Greatest Poetry Slam" DVD series (2004, 2005, 2007, 2008) and starred in the movie "Hawaii Slam: Poetry in Paradise."
 Has conducted workshops at over 200 schools, libraries, & prisons throughout his career.

References

External links

Kealoha's Official Website
Kealoha's MySpace Page
HawaiiSlam Website

American male poets
American spoken word poets
Slam poets
Poets Laureate of Hawaii
Native Hawaiian writers
Writers from Honolulu
MIT School of Engineering alumni
American people of Native Hawaiian descent
American writers of Chinese descent
Year of birth missing (living people)
Living people
21st-century American poets
21st-century American male writers